Yevhen Anatoliyovych Pasich (born 13 July 1993) is a Ukrainian professional footballer who plays as a midfielder for Dnipro-1.

Career
Pasich began his career with FC Dnipro-2 Dnipropetrovsk.

On 4 January 2023 he moved to Dnipro-1.

Personal life
He has a twin brother Hennadiy Pasich, who is also a professional footballer.

References

External links
 
 

1993 births
Living people
People from Kamianske
Sportspeople from Dnipropetrovsk Oblast
Ukrainian footballers
FC Dnipro players
FC Dnipro-2 Dnipropetrovsk players
FC Naftovyk-Ukrnafta Okhtyrka players
NK Veres Rivne players
FC Olimpik Donetsk players
SC Dnipro-1 players
Association football midfielders
Ukrainian Premier League players
Ukrainian First League players
Ukrainian Second League players
Twin sportspeople
Ukrainian twins